Mackoght or Macoght, also called Little Errigal or Wee Errigal, is a  tall mountain in County Donegal, Ireland.

Geography 

The mountain is the second most southern and second lowest of the mountain chain called the Seven Sisters by locals. The Seven Sisters are Muckish, Crocknalaragagh, Aghla Beg, Ardloughnabrackbaddy, Aghla More, Mackoght and Errigal. The Seven Sisters are part of the Derryveagh Mountains. Mackoght is also the 351st tallest peak in Ireland.

References

Marilyns of Ireland
Mountains and hills of County Donegal